Abdul Khabeer Azad is a Pakistani Islamic scholar who is the current chairman of Ruet-e-Hilal Committee, Pakistan.

Early life and career 
He is the son of Muhammad Abdul Qadir Azad who is the former grand imam of famous Islamic heritage Badshahi Mosque situated in Lahore, Pakistan. He is the khateeb of Badshahi Mosque and was appointed as the chairman of Ruet-e-Hilal Committee on 30 December 2020 by Ministry of Religious Affairs and Inter-faith Harmony, Government of Pakistan succeeding its long-term serving chairman Mufti Muneeb-ur-Rehman.

See also
 Ruet-e-Hilal Committee
 Muneeb-ur-Rehman

References

Pakistani Sunni Muslim scholars of Islam
Living people
Year of birth missing (living people)